Yosef Garfinkel (hebrew: יוסף גרפינקל; born 1956) is an Israeli archaeologist and academic. He is Professor of Prehistoric Archaeology and of Archaeology of the Biblical Period at the Hebrew University of Jerusalem.

Biography
Yosef (Yossi) Garfinkel was born in 1956 in Haifa, Israel. He served in the Israel Defense Forces between 1975 and 1978. He studied at Hebrew University, graduating with a Bachelor of Arts (BA) degree in geography and archaeology in 1981, a Master of Arts (MA) degree in prehistory and Biblical archaeology in 1987, and a Doctor of Philosophy (PhD) degree in 1991.

He is a curator of the museum of Yarmukian Culture at Kibbutz Sha'ar HaGolan. Garfinkel specializes in the Protohistoric era of the Near East, the period of time when the world’s earliest village communities were established and the beginning of agriculture took place. He has excavated numerous Neolithic and Chalcolithic sites, including Gesher, Yiftahel, Neolithic Ashkelon, Sha'ar HaGolan, Tel ‘Ali and Tel Tsaf. Garfinkel is the author of 12 books and over 100 articles on ancient architecture, farming, water sources, pottery, art, religion and dance.

In 2007, he began conducting excavations at the fortified city of Khirbet Qeiyafa. This site is dated to the early 10th century BC, the period of the biblical King David. In the 2008 season an inscription was discovered written in ink on a pottery shard in a script which is probably Early Alphabetic/Proto Phoenician,. This might be the earliest Hebrew inscription ever found, although the actual language of the inscription is still under debate.

He is currently digging at Tel Lachish in search of Iron Age fortifications.

Excavations
 Tel Lachish
 Khirbet Qeiyafa
 Tel Tsaf: 2004 (preliminary survey), 2006 (first season)
 Sha'ar HaGolan
 Yiftahel
 Neolithic Ashkelon
 Gesher

Published work
 Y. Garfinkel. 1992. The Pottery Assemblages of Sha'ar HaGolan and Rabah Stages from Munhata (Israel). Paris: Association Paléorient.
 Y. Garfinkel. 1995. Human and Animal Figurines of Munhata, Israel. Paris: Association Paléorient.
 Y. Garfinkel. 1999. Neolithic and Chalcolithic Pottery of the Southern Levant. (Qedem 39). Jerusalem: Institute of Archaeology, Hebrew University.
 Y. Garfinkel, and M. Miller. 2002. Sha'ar HaGolan Vol 1. Neolithic Art in Context. Oxford: Oxbow.
 Y. Garfinkel. 2003. Dance at the Dawn of Agriculture. Austin: Texas University Press.
 Y. Garfinkel. 2004. The Goddess of Sha'ar HaGolan. Excavations at a Neolithic Site in Israel. Jerusalem: Israel Exploration Society.
 Y. Garfinkel and D. Dag. 2006. Gesher: A Pre-Pottery Neolithic A Site in the Central Jordan Valley, Israel. A Final Report. Berlin: Ex Oriente.
 Y. Garfinkel and S. Cohen. 2007. The Early Middle Bronze Cemetery of Gesher. Final Excavation Report. AASOR 62. Boston: American Schools of Oriental Research.
 Y. Garfinkel and D. Dag. 2008 Neolithic Ashkelon. (Qedem 47). Jerusalem: Institute of Archaeology, Hebrew University.
 O. Bar-Yosef and Y. Garfinkel. 2008. The Prehistory of Israel. Human Cultures before Writing. Jerusalem: Ariel (Hebrew).

References

External links
 Prof. Yosef Garfinkel Homepage
Prize Find: Oldest Hebrew Inscription Biblical Archaeology Review

1956 births
Living people
Israeli archaeologists
Israeli Jews
Jewish historians